The following is a list of weekly number-one singles on the Billboard Japan Hot 100 chart in 2021.

Chart history

See also
List of Billboard Japan Hot Albums number ones of 2021

References

2021 in Japanese music
Japan Hot 100
Lists of number-one songs in Japan